The WindRider 17 is a small trimaran sailboat with foot pedal steering, for up to four people. It was designed by well known multihull sailboat designer Jim Brown and launched by WindRider LLC in 2002.  Production had ended by 2020.

See also
 List of multihulls

References

Trimarans
Sailboat types built by WindRider LLC